The 1991 Fuji 1000 km was the second round of the 1991 All Japan Sports Prototype Car Endurance Championship season. It took place at Fuji Speedway, Japan on May 5, 1991.

Race results
Results are as follows:

Statistics
Pole Position – #1 Nissan R91CP – 1:15.188
Winner's Race Time – 5:28:38.962

References

Fuji 1000km
6 Hours of Fuji